Joel Tanner Hart  (February 10, 1810 - March 2, 1877) was an American sculptor.

Life and work

Joel Tanner Hart  was born 10 Feb 1810 near  Winchester, in Clark County, Kentucky to  Josiah Hart (1764-1845) and  Judith Tanner Hart  (1772-1825)  and was a sculptor of importance during America's antebellum years. As a young man, he worked as a stone-cutter, developing his skills as a sculptor. In the 1840s he joined a growing artistic and literary community in Florence, Italy where he lived for the remainder of his life.

Joel Tanner Hart is best known for busts of Andrew Jackson (1838) and Henry Clay (1847). As well, he carved those of John Jordan Crittenden and Cassius M. Clay and created the statues called Il Penseroso (1853) and Woman Triumphant that stood at the Fayette County courthouse until it was destroyed by fire in 1897.

He also sculpted the bas-relief for the tombstone of Southwood Smith in the English Cemetery in Florence. Hart died in Florence in 1877 and was buried in the same English Cemetery. By Legislative Act, his remains were later exhumed and returned to his native state of Kentucky for reinterment in the Frankfort Cemetery in Frankfort, Kentucky.

Archival collections
Title:   Joel T. Hart Letters, 1829-1864.  Collection Number:  02797-z.   The Wilson Special Collections Library.  Polk Place. University of North Carolina. Chapel Hill Campus.  
Title:  Joel T. Hart Papers, 1836, 1876.   Kentucky Historical Society.   University of Kentucky. 
Title: Joel Tanner Hart Poems.  Catalog Number SC 1488.   Kentucky Historical Society.

References

External links
 
 Guide to the Reuben T. Durrett Collection of Joel Tanner Hart Papers 1823-1876 at the University of Chicago Special Collections Research Center

1810 births
1877 deaths
19th-century American sculptors
19th-century American male artists
American male sculptors
Sculptors from Kentucky
Burials at Frankfort Cemetery
People from Clark County, Kentucky
American expatriates in Italy